Guglielmelli is an Italian surname. Notable people with the surname include:

Arcangelo Guglielmelli ( 1650–1723), Italian architect and painter
Vincenzo Patrick Guglielmelli (born 1987), Italian footballer
Joey Gugliemelli, American drag queen known as Sherry Pie

Italian-language surnames
Patronymic surnames
Surnames from given names